Rádio – Top 100 (originally Rádio Top 100 Oficiální) is the Czech national airplay chart published by the IFPI Czech Republic on a weekly basis. 
Besides the main Top 100 record chart, also two component charts are effective. The Rádio Top 50 features songs released exclusively by Czech and/or Slovak artists. Online versions of the charts are released at ifpicr.cz/hitparada, featuring Top 100, respectively Top 50 positions, depending on a chart release.

List of number-one songs
List of number-one songs (Czech Republic)

See also
Slovak Rádio Top 100 airplay chart

References

External links 
ifpicr.cz 
Rádio Top 100 

Record charts
Czech music